Rafael Ramazotti de Quadros (born 9 August 1988), sometimes known as just Ramazotti for his Italian heritage, is a Brazilian association footballer who plays as a striker for Gibraltar National League club Glacis United.

Club career
Before signing with the Japanese club Avispa Fukuoka on a loan, Ramazotti had played in Brazil with several clubs, as well as appearing for a team in Portugal. He made his debut for Avispa Fukuoka in the 6–0 thumping Avispa received at the hands of Kashima Antlers on the 28 August 2011.

After 4 substitute appearances, including a goal scored against Shimizu S-Pulse, he left Avispa having failed to avoid relegation. Soon after leaving Japan, he arrived in Switzerland where he signed a contract with FC Zurich until the end of the season, with an extension clause.

DPMM FC
Ramazotti signed with Bruneian club DPMM FC in 2015 and became the top-scorer of the Singapore S.League with 21 goals in a title-winning season. He was also nominated for the Best Goal and Best Player awards.

He won the S.League Golden Boot once again the following year, but his team finished in third place this time. He left DPMM after the conclusion of his third season with the Bruneian side, scoring 14 league goals.

Hougang United
In 2019, he signed for Hougang United for only 23 days and ditched by the "abruptly vacated the club’s tenanted apartment" and “left Singapore” without settling the compensation to the club. On 29 January, he has been unveiled on Tuesday as a new player of FC Juarez, a Mexican club that plays in the second tier of the Mexican football pyramid - Liga MX.

Career statistics

Club

References

External links
 

1988 births
Living people
Brazilian people of Italian descent
Brazilian footballers
Brazilian expatriate footballers
Campeonato Brasileiro Série A players
Campeonato Brasileiro Série C players
Liga Portugal 2 players
J1 League players
J3 League players
Swiss Super League players
Singapore Premier League players
Malaysia Super League players
Ascenso MX players
K League 2 players
Sociedade Esportiva Palmeiras players
Grêmio Esportivo Juventus players
União São João Esporte Clube players
Esporte Clube Santo André players
Gil Vicente F.C. players
Avispa Fukuoka players
FC Zürich players
Clube Atlético Bragantino players
Esporte Clube Passo Fundo players
Agremiação Sportiva Arapiraquense players
Gainare Tottori players
DPMM FC players
PKNS F.C. players
Hougang United FC players
FC Juárez footballers
Daejeon Hana Citizen FC players
Expatriate footballers in Brunei
Expatriate footballers in Japan
Expatriate footballers in Switzerland
Expatriate footballers in Portugal
Expatriate footballers in Singapore
Expatriate footballers in Malaysia
Expatriate footballers in Mexico
Expatriate footballers in South Korea
Brazilian expatriate sportspeople in Brunei
Brazilian expatriate sportspeople in Japan
Brazilian expatriate sportspeople in Switzerland
Brazilian expatriate sportspeople in Portugal
Brazilian expatriate sportspeople in Singapore
Brazilian expatriate sportspeople in Malaysia
Brazilian expatriate sportspeople in Mexico
Brazilian expatriate sportspeople in South Korea
Association football forwards